Renato Adriano Jacó Moreira (born 15 September 1984), known as Renato Cajá, is a Brazilian footballer who plays for Inter de Limeira as an attacking midfielder.

Club career
He previously played for Juventude, Ponte Preta, Grêmio and Botafogo in the Campeonato Brasileiro.

On 8 March 2011, Chinese Super League club Guangzhou Evergrande announced that they had signed Renato Cajá on a four-year deal with a fee of US$2.25 million. On 9 April, he made his CSL debut in a 1–1 away draw against Nanchang Hengyuan in the second round of the season. On 17 April, in a league match which Guangzhou Evergrande played against Beijing Guoan at home, he was unhappy for being substituted out by team manager Lee Jang-Soo and returned to dressing room directly. He received a ban of 3 matches and was sent to reserve team by the club. After Cléo suffered a muscular strain in early May, he had a further chance to play for the club. However, Renato Cajá eventually could not adapt himself to the team's strategy. On 2 July, Argentine midfielder Darío Conca joined Guangzhou Evergrande with a domestic record fee of $10 million. Renato Cajá was ruled out in the squad due to the foreign players restricted. He was loaned back to Ponte Preta on 15 July for one year with a fee of 600,000 USD.

In June 2012, Renato Cajá was loaned to J1 League side Kashima Antlers for 6 months. Kashima Antlers also had an option to make the move permanent in the end of the 2012 league season with a fee of US$2 million. Renato Cajá made his debut in the first leg of 2012 J. League Cup quarter-finals which Kashima Antlers played against Cerezo Osaka on 25 July, coming on as a substitute for Júnior Dutra in the second half. His first J League debut came on 3 days later, in a 2–2 home draw against Sanfrecce Hiroshima. On 1 August, Renato Cajá scored his first goal for Kashima in the 2012 Suruga Bank Championship. He kept his good performance and scored his first league goal from a direct free kick on 11 August, which ensured Kashima beat Júbilo Iwata 2–1. Renato Cajá scored 3 goals in 20 appearances for Kashima before he was loaned return to Guangzhou Evergrande on 30 December.

Renato Cajá moved to Campeonato Brasileiro Série A side Vitória on loan on 15 January 2013. On 13 January 2014, he was loaned to Süper Lig side Bursaspor until the end of 2013-2014 league season. In July 2014, he was transferred to Série B club Ponte Preta.

References

External links

Living people
1984 births
Brazilian footballers
Association football midfielders
Campeonato Brasileiro Série A players
Campeonato Brasileiro Série B players
Mogi Mirim Esporte Clube players
Esporte Clube Juventude players
Botafogo de Futebol e Regatas players
Grêmio Foot-Ball Porto Alegrense players
Associação Atlética Ponte Preta players
Esporte Clube Vitória players
Esporte Clube Bahia players
Ittihad FC players
Chinese Super League players
Guangzhou F.C. players
J1 League players
Kashima Antlers players
Süper Lig players
Bursaspor footballers
Sharjah FC players
Goiás Esporte Clube players
Associação Ferroviária de Esportes players
Centro Sportivo Alagoano players
Associação Atlética Internacional (Limeira) players
Brazilian expatriate footballers
Brazilian expatriate sportspeople in China
Expatriate footballers in China
Expatriate footballers in Saudi Arabia
Brazilian expatriate sportspeople in Japan
Expatriate footballers in Japan
Brazilian expatriate sportspeople in Turkey
Expatriate footballers in Turkey
UAE Pro League players
Saudi Professional League players
Sportspeople from Paraíba